The 45 mm anti-aircraft gun (21-K) was a Soviet design adapted from the 45 mm anti-tank gun M1932 (19-K). It was used by the Soviet Navy to equip almost all of their ships from 1934 as its primary light anti-aircraft gun until replaced by the fully automatic 37 mm 70-K gun from 1942 to 1943. It was used in World War II and during the Cold War as the Soviets exported their World War II-era ships to their friends and allies. However it was not very effective as its slow rate of fire and lack of a time fuze required a direct hit to damage targets.

Design
The 46-caliber21-K was a minimal adaptation of the 53-K anti-tank gun that was created by taking the latter's barrel and mounting it on a simple pedestal mount. Its semi-automatic breech automatically ejected the cartridge case and locked open, ready for the next round. This was less than ideal for an anti-aircraft weapon that relied on its rate of fire to inflict damage on aircraft because every round had to be hand-loaded. Fully automatic weapons of roughly this caliber like the 40 mm Bofors typically used 4-5 round clips of ammunition to produce rates of fire four times as high.

Early production guns had a built-up barrel, but later ones used a monobloc. There were problems with the breech mechanism early in the production run and a number of the first year's production run lacked the semi-automatic breech entirely.

Description
It was manually operated and could elevate between -10° and +85° at a rate between 10 and 20 degrees per second. It could traverse a full 360° at a rate between 10 and 18 degrees per second, although this was practically limited by its actual location on ship. In the mid-1930s special powered turrets were developed for use on river monitors. Both turrets could elevate between -5° and +85° at a rate of 8 degrees per second and could traverse a full 360° at a rate between 4.8 and 9.8 degrees per second.

Ammunition
The 21-K used the same ammunition as the 45 mm anti-tank gun M1937 (53-K). The biggest problem in its role as an anti-aircraft gun was that it wasn't provided with a time fuze that would detonate the shell at a specified distance from the gun. This meant that only a direct hit would damage its target.

See also

Notes

References

External links
 
 K-21 on navweaps.com

45 mm artillery
Naval anti-aircraft guns
World War II anti-aircraft guns
World War II artillery of the Soviet Union
Anti-aircraft guns of the Soviet Union
Military equipment introduced in the 1930s